Lyskovsky (masculine), Lyskovskaya (feminine), or Lyskovskoye (neuter) may refer to:
Lyskovsky District, a district of Nizhny Novgorod Oblast, Russia
Lyskovskaya, a rural locality (a village) in Vologda Oblast, Russia